William Blakeney, 1st Baron Blakeney (1672–1761) was a British Army lieutenant general. General Blakeney''' may also refer to:

Edward Blakeney (1778–1868), British Army general
R. B. D. Blakeney (1872–1952), British Army brigadier general